David Zaharakis (born 21 February 1990) is a former professional Australian rules footballer who played 13 seasons for the Essendon Football Club in the Australian Football League (AFL).

Early life
Zaharakis attended Our Lady Help of Christians Primary School and finished Year 12 in 2008 at Marcellin College, where he also won the Terrence Cleary Memorial Sporting Award for sportsmanship and sporting excellence. He played for the Northern Knights in the TAC Cup and junior football for Eltham in the Northern Football League. He was named in the under-18 All-Australian team, playing for Vic Metro.

AFL career
He was awarded the number 11 guernsey, which was previously worn by Damien Peverill. He made his debut against  in Round 2, 2009, and earned the Rising Star nomination on debut. In Round 5, 2009, against Collingwood at the age of 19, he kicked the match-winning goal during the final seconds of the Anzac Day match to help the Bombers win by five points.

During 2011, he was able to make the most of his opportunity in the midfield, with the ability to move forward and kick over 30 goals for the season, winning the W.S. Crichton Medal in the process.

In Round 5, 2013, he won the Anzac Day Medal, where he recorded 34 disposals and kicked four goals. It was revealed by his manager during 2013 that he did not take any part in Essendon's 2012 controversial sport science program that placed the club under scrutiny by the AFL and ASADA (Australian Sports Anti-Doping Authority) due to him suffering from a fear of needles. As a result, Zaharakis was found not guilty of using banned substances by the Court of Arbitration for Sport, and was therefore able to participate in the 2016 season.

He was delisted at the end of the 2021 season, but he was enlisted as a COVID top-up player for the Melbourne Football Club for the 2022 season; however, he did not end up playing any games for them.

Personal life
Zaharakis is currently studying a Bachelor of Property and Real Estate at Deakin University. In November 2022, it was announced that Zaharakis was cast for Australian Survivor: Heroes V Villains as a member of the Heroes tribe.

Statistics
Statistics are correct to the end of Round 12, 2021

|- style="background-color: #EAEAEA"
! scope="row" | 
|  || 11 || 10 || 7 || 8 || 87 || 50 || 137 || 47 || 25 || 0.7 || 0.8 || 8.7 || 5.0 || 13.7 || 4.7 || 2.5
|-
! scope="row" | 
|  || 11 || 20 || 19 || 18 || 178 || 141 || 319 || 93 || 52 || 1.0 || 0.9 || 8.9 || 7.0 || 16.0 || 4.6 || 2.6
|- style="background-color: #EAEAEA"
! scope="row" | 
|  || 11 || 23 || 31 || 17 || 277 || 195 || 472 || 103 || 88 || 1.4 || 0.7 || 12.0 || 8.5 || 20.5 || 4.5 || 3.8
|-
! scope="row" | 
|  || 11 || 13 || 7 || 8 || 171 || 119 || 290 || 43 || 42 || 0.5 || 0.6 || 13.2 || 9.2 || 22.3 || 3.3 || 3.2
|- style="background-color: #EAEAEA"
! scope="row" | 
|  || 11 || 21 || 9 || 17 || 266 || 210 || 476 || 73 || 62 || 0.4 || 0.8 || 12.7 || 10.0 || 22.7 || 3.5 || 3.0
|-
! scope="row" | 
|  || 11 || 23 || 14 || 14 || 332 || 228 || 560 || 108 || 85 || 0.6 || 0.6 || 14.4 || 9.9 || 24.4 || 4.7 || 3.7
|- style="background-color: #EAEAEA"
! scope="row" | 
|  || 11 || 16 || 9 || 3 || 149 || 151 || 300 || 59 || 63 || 0.6 || 0.2 || 9.3 || 9.4 || 18.8 || 3.7 || 3.9
|-
! scope="row" | 
|  || 11 || 21 || 5 || 6 || 281 || 241 || 522 || 75 || 99 || 0.2 || 0.3 || 13.4 || 11.5 || 24.9 || 3.6 || 4.7
|- style="background-color: #EAEAEA"
! scope="row" | 
|  || 11 || 23 || 11 || 14 || 323 || 267 || 590 || 107 || 107 || 0.5 || 0.6 || 14.0 || 11.6 || 25.7 || 4.7 || 4.7
|-
! scope="row" | 
|  || 11 || 17 || 7 || 6 || 240 || 195 || 435 || 85 || 62 || 0.4 || 0.4 || 14.1 || 11.5 || 25.6 || 5.0 || 3.7
|- style="background-color: #EAEAEA"
! scope="row" | 
|  || 11 || 20 || 6 || 2 || 238 || 168 || 406 || 99 || 56 || 0.3 || 0.1 || 11.9 || 8.4 || 20.3 || 5.0 || 2.8
|-
! scope="row" style="text-align:center" | 2020
|  || 11 || 10 || 9 || 4 || 63 || 79 || 142 || 24 || 20 || 0.9 || 0.4 || 6.3 || 7.9 || 14.2 || 2.4 || 2.0
|-
! scope="row" | 
|  || 11 || 7 || 1 || 2 || 43 || 28 || 71 || 18 || 14 || 0.1 || 0.2 || 6.1 || 4.0 || 10.1 || 2.5 || 2.0
|- style="background-color: #EAEAEA"
|- class="sortbottom"
! colspan=3| Career
! 226
! 136
! 119
! 2648
! 2072
! 4720
! 934
! 775
! 0.6
! 0.5
! 11.8
! 9.2
! 21.0
! 4.1
! 3.4
|}

References

External links

 

Essendon Football Club players
Crichton Medal winners
Living people
Australian people of Greek descent
1990 births
Australian rules footballers from Victoria (Australia)
Northern Knights players
Eltham Football Club players
People educated at Marcellin College, Bulleen
Australian Survivor contestants